Wadsworth Hospital was a 50-bed private hospital that, after being cited by Federal, State and New York City oversight agencies, and subsequently losing funding, closed in 1976.

History
This five-story Washington Heights hospital agreed in April 1976, after pressure from oversight agencies, to close. The 1929-built structure had one serious violation: a "single front door, which is the only exit from the upper floors" (which the hospital refused to remedy: "contended that putting in another exit would mean cutting down on the number of beds").

The location, 629 West 185th Street, became a medical office building.

Loss of funding
Wadsworth, "where the most-frequent procedure was abortion," was one of three in a series of hospitals closed in the mid-1970s for "life-threatening fire and health violations." Initially they each lost certification, then they lost funding. As a result, it was "economically unfeasible for the hospital to stay in business."

See also
 List of hospitals in Manhattan

References

Defunct hospitals in Manhattan